The 1932 United States presidential election in Georgia took place on November 8, 1932, as part of the 1932 United States presidential election. Voters chose 12 representatives, or electors, to the Electoral College, who voted for president and vice president.

Background and vote
With the exception of a handful of historically Unionist North Georgia counties – chiefly Fannin but also to a lesser extent Pickens, Gilmer and Towns – Georgia since the 1880s had been a one-party state dominated by the Democratic Party. Disfranchisement of almost all African-Americans and most poor whites had made the Republican Party virtually nonexistent outside of local governments in those few hill counties, and the national Democratic Party served as the guardian of white supremacy against a Republican Party historically associated with memories of Reconstruction. The only competitive elections were Democratic primaries, which state laws restricted to whites on the grounds of the Democratic Party being legally a private club.

The previous election of 1928 had seen many Protestant ministers in this state stand strongly opposed to Catholic Democratic nominee Al Smith, with the result that Republican candidate Herbert Hoover was able to gain considerable support in the largely white but secessionist upcountry. However, unlike in Alabama, where Hoover nearly carried the state due to the Alabama U.S. Senator James Thomas Heflin supporting him over Smith, in Georgia no local Democrats supported Hoover.

The onset of the Great Depression completely destroyed any hope of building on the gains from anti-Catholicism and growing urban middle class presidential Republican voting which had been seen since 1920. In fact, Hoover fell far below typical Republican percentages from before the 1920s, and Roosevelt won more than ninety percent of ballots in Georgia as a whole and in all but twenty-two of the state’s 159 counties. His performance is the best in Georgia by any presidential candidates since Andrew Jackson won the state uncontested exactly a century previously. Despite this landslide victory, Georgia was the only Deep South state in which Hoover carried any counties.

Results

Results by congressional districts

Results by county

Notes

References

Georgia
1932
1932 Georgia (U.S. state) elections